Novotaynyashevo (Yañı Taynaş) is a rural locality (a village) in Chekmagushevsky District, Bashkortostan, Russia. The population was 19 as of 2010. There is 1 street.

Geography 
Novotaynyashevo is located 38 km west of Chekmagush (the district's administrative centre) by road. Starogusevo and Novogusevo are the nearest rural localities.

References 

Rural localities in Chekmagushevsky District